Tricentra is a genus of moths in the family Geometridae.

Species
Tricentra acuta Herbulot, 1993
Tricentra aequilobata Herbulot, 1993
Tricentra albiguttata (Warren, 1906)
Tricentra allotmeta Prout, 1917
Tricentra amibomena Prout, 1918
Tricentra angulisigna Dognin, 1908
Tricentra apicata Dognin, 1910
Tricentra argentipuncta (Warren, 1897)
Tricentra ascantia (Druce, 1892)
Tricentra auctidisca Prout, 1918
Tricentra aurata (Warren, 1906)
Tricentra aurilimbata Warren, 1906
Tricentra benevisio Prout, 1932
Tricentra biguttata Warren, 1906
Tricentra bisignata Warren, 1907
Tricentra brunneomarginata Warren, 1906
Tricentra cambogiata (Warren, 1897)
Tricentra carnaria (Herrich-Schaffer, 1854)
Tricentra citrinaria Warren, 1907
Tricentra commixta Warren, 1905
Tricentra computaria (Snellen, 1874)
Tricentra concava Herbulot, 1993
Tricentra consequens Warren, 1906
Tricentra debilis Dognin, 1906
Tricentra decorata Warren, 1905
Tricentra devigescens Prout, 1917
Tricentra ellima (Schaus, 1901)
Tricentra euriopis (Dyar, 1914)
Tricentra flavicurvata Dognin, 1910
Tricentra flavifigurata Prout, 1917
Tricentra flavimarginata Warren, 1900
Tricentra flavimargo Warren, 1905
Tricentra flavitornata Prout, 1922
Tricentra fulvifera Dognin, 1908
Tricentra fumata (Warren, 1906)
Tricentra gavisata (Walker, 1863)
Tricentra gibbimargo Prout, 1918
Tricentra ignefumosa Warren, 1906
Tricentra irregularis Prout, 1935
Tricentra kindli Herbulot, 1993
Tricentra lalannei Herbulot, 1993
Tricentra mimula Warren, 1907
Tricentra navatteae Herbulot, 1993
Tricentra necula Druce, 1892
Tricentra neomysta Prout, 1935
Tricentra ocrisia (Druce, 1892)
Tricentra oeno (Druce, 1892)
Tricentra percrocea Warren, 1906
Tricentra protuberans Dognin, 1910
Tricentra quadrigata (Felder & Rogenhofer, 1875)
Tricentra spilopera Prout, 1935
Tricentra subnexa Prout, 1935
Tricentra subplumbea Bastelberger, 1908
Tricentra unimacula Dognin, 1911
Tricentra vinosata Warren, 1906

References

External links
Natural History Museum Lepidoptera genus database

Rhodostrophiini